Tyler Warne Paul (born  in Duiwelskloof, South Africa) is a South African rugby union player for the  in Super Rugby and the  in the Rugby Challenge. He can play as a lock or a flanker.

Career

Youth

In 2013, Paul was named in the Eastern Province Country Districts' side for the 2013 Under-18 Craven Week competition. He progressed to the  side during the same year and started seven matches for the team during the 2013 Under-19 Provincial Championship. He also started in the final, where the EP Kings beat the  side 56–40 in Nelspruit to clinch the Division B trophy. He also played in their promotion/relegation play-off against near-neighbours , which the Kings won 27–20 to win promotion to Division A for 2014.

At the end-of-season awards ceremony, Paul was voted as the EP Kings' U19 Player of the Year for 2013.

Eastern Province Kings

His senior debut came during the 2014 Vodacom Cup competition.

South Africa Under-20

In March 2015, Paul was named in an extended South Africa Under-20 training group as part of their preparation for the 2015 World Rugby Under 20 Championship.

References

1995 births
Living people
People from Greater Letaba Local Municipality
South African rugby union players
Eastern Province Elephants players
Southern Kings players
Rugby union locks
Rugby union flankers
Alumni of St. Andrew's College, Grahamstown
Sportspeople from Limpopo
Sharks (Currie Cup) players
Sharks (rugby union) players
NTT DoCoMo Red Hurricanes Osaka players
Rugby union players from Limpopo
Urayasu D-Rocks players